Presidential elections were held in Brazil on 1 March 1906. The result was a victory for Afonso Pena of the Minas Republican Party, who received 97.9% of the vote.

Results

References

Presidential elections in Brazil
Brazil
Presidential
Brazil
Election and referendum articles with incomplete results
Elections of the First Brazilian Republic